Korotoyak is a rural locality (a selo) and the administrative center of Korotoyaksky Selsoviet, Khabarsky District, Altai Krai, Russia. The population was 1,090 as of 2013. It was founded in 1913. There are 12 streets.

Geography 
Korotoyak is located 21 km northeast of Khabary (the district's administrative centre) by road. Tselinny is the nearest rural locality.

References 

Rural localities in Khabarsky District